Dietrich Austermann (born 22 October 1941) is a German politician. He represents the CDU. Austermann was a member of the Bundestag from the state of Schleswig-Holstein from 1982 to 2005.

Life 
Austermann succeeded Olaf Baron von Wrangel, who left the Bundestag on April 16, 1982, and was subsequently a member of the German Bundestag until his resignation on May 4, 2005. From 27 April 2005 to 9 July 2008 he was Minister of Science, Economics and Transport in Schleswig-Holstein.

External links

 Web Archive of the German Bundestag of 15 November 2005

References

 

1941 births
Living people
Ministers of the Schleswig-Holstein State Government
Members of the Bundestag for Schleswig-Holstein
Members of the Bundestag 2002–2005
Members of the Bundestag 1998–2002
Members of the Bundestag 1994–1998
Members of the Bundestag 1990–1994
Members of the Bundestag 1987–1990
Members of the Bundestag 1983–1987
Members of the Bundestag 1980–1983
Christian Democratic Union of Germany politicians